Olearia suffruticosa, commonly known as clustered daisy-bush, is a species of flowering plant in the family Asteraceae and is endemic to south-eastern continental Australia. It is a shrub or undershrub with scattered, linear, grass-like leaves and pink to white and yellow and pink, daisy-like inflorescences.

Description

Taxonomy
Olearia suffruticosa was first formally described in 1985 by David Alan Cooke in the Journal of the Adelaide Botanic Gardens from specimens collected near the Bool Lagoon in 1963. The specific epithet (suffruticosa) means "somewhat woody".

Distribution and habitat
Clustered daisy-bush grows in heathland in swampy areas in the far south-east of South Australia, the south-west of Victoria near Glenisla, Casterton and Dergholm, and between Capertee and Wallerawang in New South Wales.

Conservation status
This olearia is listed as "endangered" under the Victoria Government Flora and Fauna Guarantee Act 1988 and as "vulnerable" in the Department of Sustainability and Environment's Advisory List of Rare Or Threatened Plants In Victoria.

References

Asterales of Australia
Flora of New South Wales
Flora of Victoria (Australia)
Flora of South Australia
suffruticosa
Plants described in 1985